Breathe In is a 2013 American romantic drama film co-written with Ben York Jones and directed by Drake Doremus, starring Guy Pearce, Felicity Jones, and Amy Ryan. It follows a high school music teacher who has an affair with a foreign exchange student from England who is his daughter's age, stemming from his disillusion with life and their shared love of music. It premiered at the Sundance Film Festival on January 19, 2013, the director's third film to play there.

Plot
Keith Reynolds is a high school music teacher married to Megan and living in a small town an hour and half from New York City. He gave up a career as a musician following the arrival of their daughter. Lauren is very nearly 18 and is a champion swimmer. In his spare time, he substitutes for a cello player in an orchestra and is applying for a permanent role. Keith finds his life frustrating, resents his job as a teacher, and his wife's dismissal of his music playing. He wants to move back to the city and work as a musician, but his wife Megan refuses to consider this as she disliked the uncertainty of the income and the lifestyle.

The family is to host a foreign exchange student from England, Sophie, for one semester. When Sophie arrives, she is disappointed by the distance from Manhattan which she wanted to visit. Sophie's mother died when she was very young and she was raised by her uncle and aunt. Her uncle introduced her to the piano but has recently died, affecting Sophie badly. Sophie tells her aunt that she is not practicing her music because she does not know who she is playing for anymore.

Sophie reveals to Keith that she is an accomplished musician and they bond over their mutual interest. While they are alone at the house, she tells Keith about the death of her uncle and that she wants to choose to play music. Sophie is unsure and has lost her purpose following her uncle's death, so she does not play. Keith has chosen not to play for the sake of his family.

Keith and Sophie embark on a love affair, spending time together talking about running away together. Lauren discovers this and reveals her knowledge to Sophie by attacking her while she is asleep in bed. Sophie panics after Lauren's attack and tells Keith she must leave. Keith tells her he will run away with her. They plan to meet in New York City after a performance, packing their things.

Lauren, angry at her father and having been spurned by Aaron, gets drunk and crashes her car. Meanwhile, Megan discovers Keith and Sophie's affair and their plan to run away. While she is smashing things around the house in anger, she gets a call telling her Lauren is hurt and in hospital.

Following his performance, Keith meets up with Sophie. They load their things in the car and are smiling at each other in happiness. Suddenly Keith receives a text message from Megan telling him that something has happened to Lauren. He appears at the hospital where Megan tells him she does not know how Lauren is.

The film ends with the family having a photo shoot. Lauren is fine but has a scar near her eye. Keith has decided to return to his wife and Sophie has gone.

Cast
 Guy Pearce as Keith Reynolds
 Felicity Jones as Sophie
 Amy Ryan as Megan Reynolds
 Mackenzie Davis as Lauren Reynolds 
 Ben Shenkman as Sheldon
 Alexandra Wentworth as Wendy Sebeck
 Hugo Becker as Clément
 Brendan Dooling as Ryan
 Kyle MacLachlan as Peter Sebeck
 Lucy Davenport as Sophie's mom
 Jenny Anne Hochberg as Swim Team Member
 Elise Eberle as Angela
 Nicole Patrick as Theresa
 Brock Harris as Paul
 Stephen Sapienza as Swim Team Member
 Matthew Daddario as Aaron

Production

Casting
Breathe In is the third film from director Drake Doremus to play at the Sundance Film Festival. Doremus won the festival's dramatic grand jury prize in 2011 with Like Crazy, his first film with leading lady Felicity Jones, who took the special jury prize for acting that year. 
Discussing his casting of Jones in his early film Like Crazy, Doremus remembers, "She sent me a tape she made in her flat. She did the ending of the movie, actually in her shower. And it was like, 'OK, wow.' I cast her without even meeting her." After they completed Like Crazy, they began talking about working together again. "I felt like the journey wasn't complete yet, and that we had some more exploring to do."

Filming
Using the same technique as on Like Crazy, Doremus and co-screenwriter Ben York Jones prepared a detailed outline for each scene without dialogue, and then rehearsed with the cast for several weeks while they improvised the words. Doremus explains:
"I start with a 60-page outline that basically reads like a short story, filled with backstory, the emotional beats of the scene, subtext, plot points, but very little dialogue. ... Every take, the scene gets more and more distilled. The first take is 15 minutes, the second take is 10, and before you know it we get down to the two-minute scene we need. ... It is exhausting! But that's a great word to describe it: we exhaust every possibility until we realise what it needs to be, and when you get down to that point, the actors just don't care any more. There is no performing for the camera; there's just being, and you just gotta focus on being in the moment."

Doremus' films are known for their "intimate" style. His use of hand-held cameras, often right in the actors' faces, and his ability to draw out performances from his actors that are  natural and unaffected, creates the illusion that we're "invading private moments" in the lives of the characters.

Breathe In was filmed on location in upstate New York and Terminal 4 in JFK International Airport in Queens, New York.

Release
Breathe In received a limited release in The United States opening in 18 theatres and grossing $15,324 with an average of $851 per theatre. The film's widest release was 41 theatres and it ended up making $89,661 domestically. Internationally the film 
earned $481,079 and was re-released in South Korea in 2015, earning a further $19,128. The cumulative worldwide total was $500,207.

Reception
On Rotten Tomatoes the film has an approval rating of 56% based on reviews from 80 critics. The site's consensus states: "Breathe Ins plot never quite sparks the way it should, but it remains thoroughly watchable thanks to strong performances from Felicity Jones and Guy Pearce."
On Metacritic, the film has a weighted average score of 60 out of 100 based on reviews from 21 critics, indicating "mixed or average reviews".

In his review for Collider.com, Adam Chitwood gave the film an A− rating, noting that it is "rare to find a film of this kind that is genuinely moving without feeling overly manipulative or sappy". Chitwood continued: 
Chitwood thought the entire cast was "fantastic", singling out Pearce who "turns in one of the best performances of his career". Chitwood concludes, "With impeccable performances, inspired direction, beautiful cinematography, and a devastating story, Breathe In marks one of the best family dramas in recent years and a promisingly mature leap forward for director Drake Doremus."

In his review for CinemaBeach, Bryan Thompson called the film "an adult masterpiece that carries Doremus’s thoughtful and methodic style into something both beautiful and tragic". Thompson also praised the "subtle but beautiful performances by the film's cast", singling out Guy Pearce who is "particularly stellar" at creating the "complex and sympathetic" character of Keith. 

While pointing out that the film is as "predictable as melodrama comes", Thompson also believes the film "shines ... in the smaller moments". Thompson notes, "As Keith and Sophie explore their taboo relationship, the film can easily fall into the trap of cliché, but it skirts the edges thanks to a realism and honesty framed through fully formed characters and sequences that are quiet but speak volumes, building on relationships and emotion rather than story." Thompson concludes that despite the film's weaknesses—particularly the last act crisis that "feels forced"—the finer moments of Breathe In make up for the flaws, and that Doremus and company are "fast becoming filmmaking virtuosos".

In his first look review for The Guardian, Jeremy Kay gave the film four out of five stars, calling it a "finely calibrated piece of work from one of the more talented US film-makers to emerge in recent years". Kay notes that while the story is predictable and nothing new, Doremus "makes it all utterly captivating" and "mines just the right amount of drama and spontaneous comedy from each moment and the foreshadowing is perfectly weighted". Kay also praises the acting performances: "Pearce is rarely disappointing, and as Keith, brings a deceptively shallow authority that Sophie can see right through. ... Jones impresses again and imbues Sophie with a wise head and a gently haunted manner that speaks to an almost prescient awareness of how all this is likely to end. Ryan and Davis have less to do but offer strong support. ... As the mother, Amy Ryan is warm and welcoming, while her daughter Lauren, played by newcomer Mackenzie Davis, is equally generous and invites Sophie into her circle of friends."

References

External links
 
 

2013 films
2013 independent films
2013 romantic drama films
American independent films
American romantic drama films
2010s English-language films
Films about adultery in the United States
Films about music and musicians
Films about dysfunctional families
Films about scandalous teacher–student relationships
Films directed by Drake Doremus
Films produced by Andrea Sperling
Films produced by Jonathan Schwartz
Films scored by Dustin O'Halloran
Films set in New York City
Films shot in New York City
Indian Paintbrush (production company) films
Midlife crisis films
QED International films
2010s American films